Metro İstanbul is a public rail transport operator headquartered in Istanbul, Turkey.

Established in 1988, the company is responsible for operating most of Istanbul's rail systems, including the Istanbul Metro, Istanbul Tram, funiculars and aerial tramways.

History
The company was founded under the name of İstanbul Ulaşım A.Ş. on 16 August 1988, while Istanbul's first modern public urban rail line was under construction (Aksaray-Kocatepe section of the M1 line). Almost 28 years later, on 20 May 2016, the company was renamed as Metro İstanbul.

Lines in operation
Metro lines:
  Yenikapı - Atatürk Airport
  Yenikapı - Kirazlı
  Yenikapı - Hacıosman
  Sanayi Mahallesi - Seyrantepe
  Kirazlı - Metrokent
  Kadıköy - Sabiha Gökçen Airport
  Üsküdar - Çekmeköy
  Levent - Boğaziçi Üniversitesi/Hisarüstü
  Mecidiyeköy - Mahmutbey
  Bostancı - Parseller
  Bahariye - Olimpiyat
 İstanbul Havalimanı - Kağıthane
Tram lines:
  Bağcılar - Kabataş
  Taksim - Tünel
  Kadıköy - Moda (Ring) Heritage Tramway
  Topkapı - Mescid-i Selam
 Cibali - Alibeyköy Cep Otogarı
 
Funicular lines:
  Taksim - Kabataş
  Karaköy - Beyoğlu Tünel
  Seyrantepe - Vadi Istanbul
  Boğaziçi Üni./Hisarüstü–Aşiyan

Gondola lines:
  Maçka - Taşkışla
  Eyüp - Piyerloti

References

External links
  — Official website

Public transport operators in Turkey
Transport in Istanbul
Government-owned companies of Turkey
Companies based in Istanbul
Transport companies established in 1988
1988 establishments in Turkey